JJU may refer to:

 Qaqortoq Heliport, in Greenland
 Jju language, spoken in Nigeria
 JJu (video gamer) (born 1983), gamer name of Byun Eun-jong, a South Korean professional StarCraft player